The Waiaruhe River is a river of the Northland Region of New Zealand's North Island. It flows northeast from its origins close to Ngawha Springs to reach the northern Waitangi River five kilometres south of Kerikeri.

See also
List of rivers of New Zealand

References

Rivers of the Northland Region
Rivers of New Zealand